Marius Costel Gherman (born 14 July 1967) is a Romanian artistic gymnast who represented Romania at the 1988 Olympic Games and at the 1992 Olympic Games. His best event was the horizontal bar for which he medaled bronze at the 1988 Olympic Games  and silver at the 1993 World Championships. He is also a bronze continental medalist on vault and on horizontal bar.

After retiring from competitions Gherman worked in United Kingdom as a gymnastics coach.

References

External links

 
 

Living people
1967 births
Gymnasts at the 1988 Summer Olympics
Gymnasts at the 1992 Summer Olympics
Romanian male artistic gymnasts
Olympic gymnasts of Romania
Olympic bronze medalists for Romania
Medalists at the World Artistic Gymnastics Championships
Olympic medalists in gymnastics
Medalists at the 1988 Summer Olympics
Sportspeople from Sibiu